Samoa competed at the 2012 Summer Olympics in London, from 27 July to 12 August 2012. This was the nation's eighth appearance at the Olympics, although four other games were first appeared under the name Western Samoa.

Samoa Association of Sports and National Olympic Committee Inc. (SASNOC) sent the nation's second-largest delegation to the Games, tying its record for the number of athletes with Los Angeles. A total of 8 athletes, 5 men and 3 women, competed in 6 sports. Two athletes made their second consecutive Olympic appearance, including sprint kayaker Rudolph Berking-Williams. Weightlifter Ele Opeloge, who was considered Samoa's best medal prospect after finishing fourth in Beijing, reprised her role as the nation's flag bearer at the opening ceremony. Among the sports played by the athletes, Samoa marked its Olympic debut in taekwondo. Samoa, however, has yet to win its first ever Olympic medal.

Archery

Samoa has qualified one archer; Maureen Tuimalealiifano is competing in the women's individual event.

Athletics

Men

Key
Note–Ranks given for track events are within the athlete's heat only
Q = Qualified for the next round
q = Qualified for the next round as a fastest loser or, in field events, by position without achieving the qualifying target
NR = National record
N/A = Round not applicable for the event
Bye = Athlete not required to compete in round

Canoeing

Sprint

Qualification Legend: FA = Qualify to final (medal); FB = Qualify to final B (non-medal)

Judo

Samoa has qualified 1 judoka

Taekwondo

Samoa has qualified two quota places in Taekwondo.

Weightlifting

Samoa has qualified the following quota places.

See also
 Samoa at the 2012 Summer Paralympics

References

External links

Nations at the 2012 Summer Olympics
2012
2012 in Samoan sport